Rodrigo Castro Cesar Cabral, more commonly known as Rodriguinho (born in Guarapuava on February 5, 1982) is a Brazilian footballer who acts as midfielder. He currently plays for Sport Club do Recife.

Career
Rodriguinho started his career in 2001 at Atletico Paranaense and has gone through many clubs, such as Botafogo, Bahia and Santos FC before transferring to Azerbaijani club Neftchi.

Career statistics
(Correct )

Honours
Atlético Paranaense
Campeonato Paranaense: 2001
Campeonato Brasileiro: 2001
Supercampeonato Paranaense: 2002

Sport
Campeonato Pernambucano: 2006

Santos
Campeonato Paulista: 2010
Copa do Brasil: 2010

Neftchi Baku
Azerbaijan Premier League: 2010–11

References

External links
Santos FC 
ogol.com 

1982 births
Living people
People from Guarapuava
Brazilian footballers
Sport Club do Recife players
Club Athletico Paranaense players
Guarani FC players
Santos FC players
Campeonato Brasileiro Série A players
Brazilian expatriate footballers
Expatriate footballers in Azerbaijan
Brazilian expatriate sportspeople in Azerbaijan
Association football midfielders
Neftçi PFK players
Sportspeople from Paraná (state)